Conrad von Molo (21 December 1906 – 12 August 1997) was an Austrian film producer and editor. von Molo worked primarily in the Germany industry, except for a brief spell spent in Britain in the 1930s. von Molo later specialised in overseeing the dubbing of foreign productions for German-speaking markets.

He was the son of the writer Walter von Molo. His sister Trude von Molo became a leading film actress, before suddenly retiring.

Filmography
Editor
 The Trunks of Mr. O.F. (1931)
 Die Vier vom Bob 13 (1932)
 Kavaliere vom Kurfürstendamm (1932)
 The Testament of Dr. Mabuse (1933)
 The Amateur Gentleman (1936)
 Crime Over London (1936)
 Accused (1936)
 Jump for Glory (1937)
 Then We'll Get a Divorce (1940)
 Our Miss Doctor (1940)
 Stukas (1941)
 The Red Terror (1942)
 A Salzburg Comedy (1943)

Producer
 Ludwig II (1955)
 Ich suche dich (1956)
 The Man Who Couldn't Say No (1958)
 Mit Himbeergeist geht alles besser(1960)
 The Defector (1966)

Bibliography
 Brook, Vincent. Driven to Darkness: Jewish Emigre Directors and the Rise of Film Noir. Rutgers University Press, 2009.

External links

1906 births
1997 deaths
Austrian film editors
Austrian film producers
Film people from Vienna